A bashi-bazouk (roughly "leaderless" or "disorderly") was an  irregular soldier of the Ottoman army, raised in times of war. The army chiefly recruited Albanians and Circassians as bashi-bazouks, but recruits came from all ethnic groups of the Ottoman Empire including slaves from Europe or Africa. They had a reputation for bravery, but also as an undisciplined and brutal group, notorious for looting and preying on civilians as a result of a lack of regulation and of the expectation that they would support themselves off the land.

Origin and history
Although the Ottoman armies always contained mercenaries as well as regular soldiers, the strain on the Ottoman feudal system caused mainly by the Empire's wide expanse required heavier reliance on irregular soldiers. They were armed and maintained by the government, but did not receive pay and did not wear uniforms or distinctive badges. They were motivated to fight mostly by expectations of plunder. Though the majority of troops fought on foot, some troops (called aḳıncı) rode on horseback. Because of their lack of discipline, they were incapable of undertaking major military operations, but were useful for other tasks such as reconnaissance and outpost duty. However, their uncertain temper occasionally made it necessary for the Ottoman regular troops to disarm them by force.

The Ottoman army consisted of the following:
 The Sultan's household troops, called Kapıkulu, which were salaried, most notable being Janissary corps.
 Provincial soldiers, which were fiefed (Turkish Tımarlı), the most important being Timarli Sipahi (lit. "fiefed cavalry") and their retainers (called cebelu lit. armed, man-at-arms), but other kinds were also present
 Soldiers of subject, protectorate, or allied states (the most important being the Crimean Khans)
 Bashi-bazouks, who usually did not receive regular salaries and lived off loot
Many Afro-Turks, Crimean Tatars, Muslim Roma, and Pomaks were bashi-bazouks in Rumelia.

An attempt by Koca Hüsrev Mehmed Pasha to disband his Albanian bashi-bazouks in favor of his regular forces began the rioting which led to the establishment of Muhammad Ali's Khedivate of Egypt. The use of bashi-bazouks was abandoned by the end of the 19th century. However, self-organized bashi-bazouk troops still appeared later.

The term "bashibozouk" has also been used for a mounted force, existing in peacetime in various provinces of the Ottoman Empire, which performed the duties of gendarmerie.

Reputation and atrocities

The bashi-bazouks were notorious for being violently brutal and undisciplined, thus giving the term its second, colloquial meaning of "undisciplined bandit" in many languages. A notable example of this use is in the comic series The Adventures of Tintin, where the word is often used as an insult by Captain Haddock.

The Batak massacre (1876) was carried out by thousands of bashi-bazouks sent to quell a local rebellion. Likewise, bashi-bazouks perpetrated the massacres of Candia and Phocaea in 1898 and 1914.  During the 1903 Ilinden-Preobrazhenie Uprising in Ottoman Macedonia, these troops burned 119 villages and destroyed 8400 houses, and over 50,000 Bulgarian refugees fled into the mountains.

Depictions in art

See also
 Mercenary
 Pindari, irregular horsemen in 18th-century India
 Military of the Ottoman Empire 
 Military history of Turkey

References

Sources

Ottoman warfare, 1500–1700 by Rhoads Murphey. London : UCL Press, 1999.
Özhan Öztürk (2005). Karadeniz (Black Sea): Ansiklopedik Sözlük. 2 Cilt. Heyamola Yayıncılık. İstanbul. .
Montgomery, Viscount Bernard (1968). A History of Warfare, The World Publishing Company. .

Turkish words and phrases
Military units and formations of the Ottoman Empire
Mercenary units and formations
19th century in the Ottoman Empire
Robbers
Outlaws
Ottoman period in the Balkans
Persecution of Christians in the Ottoman Empire